is a Japanese art director known for producing several acclaimed commercials and posters.

References

External links 

1940 births
Japanese art directors
Living people
People from Yokohama